Gregory Lee Justice, Jr. (born December 12, 1972) is a former American football offensive lineman. He has played in the AFL, AF2, AIFL, and the AIFA and finished his career with the Baltimore Mariners in 2009. He played college football at Delaware. Justice was formerly the General Manager of the Baltimore Mariners.

Early years
Justice grew up in Ferndale, Maryland and attended Andover High School in nearby Linthicum. He was a letterman and a standout in football, basketball, and baseball. Justice graduated from Andover High School in 1990.

References

1972 births
Living people
People from Anne Arundel County, Maryland
Players of American football from Maryland
Austin Wranglers players
Columbus Destroyers players
American football offensive tackles
Delaware Fightin' Blue Hens football players
People from Linthicum, Maryland
Norfolk Nighthawks players
Reading Express players
Richmond Speed players
Baltimore Mariners players